Khairabad is a town in Jehangira tehsil of Nowshera District in Khyber Pakhtunkhwa province of Pakistan. Attock is located to the east, Nizampur to the south and Jehangira town to the north.

Overview 
Khairabad is located at the eastern edge of Khyber Pakhtunkhwa and connects Khyber Pakhtunkhwa and Punjab through Khairabad bridge. Khairabad is entry point from Punjab to Khyber Pakhtunkhwa.

See also 
 Jehangira Tehsil
 Nowshera District

References 

Populated places in Nowshera District